Tasso Koutsoukos (born April 4, 1959) is a retired Canadian soccer player who played professionally in the North American Soccer League, Major Indoor Soccer League and Canadian Soccer League.  He also coached in the Montreal Impact in the National Professional Soccer League.

Player
Koutsoukos played collegiate soccer at UMass Amherst from 1977 to 1979.  He was a 1977 Honorable Mention (third team) All American.  In 1980, the Chicago Sting selected Koutsoukos in the North American Soccer League draft.  He played two outdoor and two indoor seasons with the Sting.  In 1982, he began the season with Chicago.  On June 13, 1982, the Sting traded Koutsoukos to the Tulsa Roughnecks in exchange for Tim Twellman and John Tyma.  In the fall of 1982, he returned to the Sting which was playing in the Major Indoor Soccer League.  In 1983, Tasso played for FC Inter Montreal. He later signed as a free agent with the Kansas City Comets.  On January 31, 1986, the Comets traded Koutsoukos to the Minnesota Strikers in exchange for John Bain.  On February 26, 1987, the Strikers sold Koutsoukos contract back to the Comets.  In 1988, he moved to the Montreal Supra of the Canadian Soccer League.

Coach
In 1998, Koutsoukos was hired to coach the Montreal Impact of the National Professional Soccer League.

References

External links
NASL/MISL stats

1959 births
Living people
Soccer players from Montreal
Canadian soccer coaches
Canadian soccer players
Canadian Soccer League (1987–1992) players
Chicago Sting (MISL) players
Chicago Sting (NASL) players
Kansas City Comets (original MISL) players
Major Indoor Soccer League (1978–1992) players
Minnesota Strikers (MISL) players
Montreal Impact (1992–2011) coaches
Montreal Supra players
North American Soccer League (1968–1984) indoor players
National Professional Soccer League (1984–2001) coaches
North American Soccer League (1968–1984) players
Tulsa Roughnecks (1978–1984) players
UMass Minutemen soccer players
Association football forwards
Association football midfielders
Inter-Montreal players
Canadian Professional Soccer League (original) players